Manfred Alonso Ugalde Arce (born 25 May 2002) is a Costa Rican professional footballer who plays as a forward for Dutch club Twente, on loan from Belgian First Division B side Lommel.

Club career
Debuting for Saprissa in early 2019, Ugalde scored two goals in a 3–1 victory over Belmopan Bandits in CONCACAF League play on 31 July 2019. He scored his first professional hat-trick in a 6–0 victory over Limón on 21 October. In November, Ugalde was named as the Best Younger Player of the 2019 CONCACAF League tournament, with four goals in seven matches.

In July 2020 Ugalde signed a contract with City Football Group and joined Belgian First Division B club Lommel.

On 25 June 2021, Ugalde joined Eredivisie side Twente on a season-long loan deal. On 1 July 2022, the loan was renewed for the 2022–23 season.

International career
Ugalde made his international senior debut for Costa Rica on 1 February 2020 against the United States, coming on as a substitute for Marco Ureña in a 1–0 defeat. 

In September 2021 after a difficult international window for Costa Rica during the third round of 2022 FIFA World Cup qualification and criticisms of his performance by head coach Luis Fernando Suárez, Ugalde announced he would no longer accept call-ups to Los Ticos as long as Suárez remained coach.

Career statistics

Honours
Saprissa
Liga FPD: Clausura 2020
CONCACAF League: 2019

Individual
CONCACAF League Best Young Player: 2019

References

External links 

2002 births
Living people
People from Heredia (canton)
Costa Rican footballers
Association football forwards
Costa Rica international footballers
Liga FPD players
Challenger Pro League players
Eredivisie players
Deportivo Saprissa players
Lommel S.K. players
FC Twente players
Costa Rican expatriate footballers
Costa Rican expatriate sportspeople in the Netherlands
Expatriate footballers in the Netherlands